Tung Chun Mei (born 27 March 1974) is a Hong Kong sailor. She competed in the women's 470 event at the 1996 Summer Olympics.

References

External links
 

1974 births
Living people
Hong Kong female sailors (sport)
Olympic sailors of Hong Kong
Sailors at the 1996 Summer Olympics – 470
Place of birth missing (living people)